Ruan Roelofse and Christopher Rungkat were the defending champions but chose not to defend their title.

Marcelo Arévalo and Miguel Ángel Reyes-Varela won the title after defeating Tomasz Bednarek and Hunter Reese 6–3, 3–6, [10–1] in the final.

Seeds

Draw

References
 Main Draw

Lisboa Belém Open - Doubles
2018 Doubles
2018 Lisboa Belém Open